The marionberry (Rubus L. subgenus Rubus) is a cultivar of blackberry developed by the USDA ARS breeding program in cooperation with Oregon State University. A cross between the 'Chehalem' and 'Olallie' varieties, it is the most common form of blackberry cultivated. It accounts for over half of all blackberries produced in Oregon.

Description and flavor 
The marionberry is a vigorously growing trailing vine, usually producing just a few canes up to 20 feet long.  The vines have many large spines, and the fruiting laterals are long and strong, producing many berries. The berry is glossy and, as with many blackberries, appears black on the plant, but turns a deep, dark purple when frozen and thawed. It is medium in size and tends to be conical, longer than it is wide.

The berry has a somewhat tart flavor, fairly earthy with traces of sweetness. It is larger, sweeter and juicier than the 'Evergreen' blackberry. The relative complexity of its flavor has led to a marketing label as the "Cabernet of Blackberries". The more powerful flavor of the marionberry has led to it dominating current blackberry production.

Development and cultivation 
The marionberry was developed by the USDA Agricultural Research Service at Oregon State University in Corvallis, Oregon. It was bred by George F. Waldo, as a mix between the small, flavorful 'Chehalem' berry and the larger, better-producing 'Olallie' berry. Both the 'Chehalem' and 'Olallie' berries are caneberry hybrids, as well. Waldo made the initial cross in 1945, selected it as OSC 928 in 1948 in Corvallis, and tested it in Marion County and elsewhere in the Willamette Valley.  The berry was released in 1956 under the name Marion, after the county where it was tested extensively.

Oregon produces between 28 million and 33 million pounds annually, with Marion County and the Willamette Valley collectively accounting for over 90% of current production. The marionberry is well adapted to the mild, maritime Oregon climate, with its mild rains and warm summers. The berries ripen throughout late spring and early summer. The harvesting season is typically between July 10 and August 10, with a single acre producing up to six tons in a harvest.

There is a hybrid variety with boysenberry in Australia called Silvanberry. Classed under the blackberry family, Sylvanberry plants have many characteristics commonly found among other blackberry varieties. These plants are long living (15 to 20 years) perennials, hardy and cold tolerant, easy to grow, and productive spreaders.

Marionberry pedigree

References 

Berries
Crops originating from North America
Hybrid Rubus
Marion County, Oregon
Oregon State University
Food and drink introduced in 1945